Kid Creme (born Nicolas Scaravilli, 1974) is a Belgian house music, producer and DJ. He is of Italian descent.

Biography
Kid Creme's formative years were spent learning to spin hip-hop and studying music theory and classic piano. After he was expelled from music college in 1991, he decided to set up his own home studio inspired mainly by the London breakbeat scene. At 19 he met Francis Shabard (DJ Murvin Jay) who introduced him to house music and together they secured DJ residencies at Club XXX, the first house club night in Brussels at the Theatre of Vaudeville.

Kid Creme spent four years as assistant engineer at Let's Go Studios, where he met his DJ partner and close friend Vito 'Junior Jack' Lucente. In 1994, Kid Creme set up his own label DTM Recordz and was offered a recording contract deal by R&S Records. At the same time Kid Creme was releasing house records through UK label Drop Dead Discs. It was Kid Creme's house remix of "Boom on Drop Dead" that caught Boy George's eye, and remixes for Junior Vasquez and Topazz followed.

PIAS offered Kid Creme a recording contract deal for his techno productions. He accepted the offer and now records for his label Deluxe Recordings under the moniker Sharpside. Their second release, "Critical Freaks", gained support with Dave Angel, Claude Young, Pete Tong, Carl Cox and Judge Jules. With Danny Tenaglia supporting track "Belgian Resistance", Luke Slater using the track "Telsco Drop" on his album and Space Cruising getting signed to Dave Angel's label, Kid Creme's techno productions were going from strength to strength.

In 2001, Kid Creme's first production under that name entitled Austin's Groove was signed to Jalapeño Records, who licensed it to Ink in the UK and Subliminal in the US. Eric Morillo added a Shawnee Taylor vocal on the record. Two following releases for Distinctive, "Niquid EP" and "Down & Under", did equally well with critics and sales.

Kid Creme came back with a bootleg of Raw Silk's "Do It To the Music" and renamed it "Hypnotising". The single was released by Positiva and reached number 31 in the UK Singles Chart.

Kid Creme's remix of "At Night", a song by Shakedown, was Seven magazine's 'Single Of The Week'. When Fatboy Slim played it at the Big Beach Boutique, he was watched by 250,000 people. Upon hearing it whilst visiting her label, Kylie Minogue asked Kid Creme to remix her single "Love at First Sight".

Discography

Singles
2000 "Austin's Groove"
2001 "Private Tools"
2003 "Down and Under"
2003 "Hypnotising"
2004 "Everybody"

Remixes
2002 Shakedown - At Night
2002 Kylie Minogue - "Love at First Sight"
2003 Pique & Nique - "You Will (Miss Me)"
2004 Planet Funk - Inside All The People

Mix compilations
2003 Junior Jack and Kid Creme In The House (Defected Records)

References

External links
Kid Creme at Discogs
             Kid Creme at Myspace

Club DJs
Remixers
Living people
Belgian DJs
Belgian house musicians
Belgian people of Italian descent
1974 births
Electronic dance music DJs